Carlos Figueroa Serrano (born 28 November 1930) is a Chilean politician and lawyer who served as minister during the presidencies of Eduardo Frei Montalva (1964−1970) and Eduardo Frei Ruíz-Tagle. Similarly, he was ambassador of Chile in Argentina.

In 1957, he graduated as a lawyer.

References

External links
 Profile at Annales de la República

1930 births

Living people
University of Chile alumni
20th-century Chilean politicians
Christian Democratic Party (Chile) politicians